Reykjanesbær is a municipality on the Southern Peninsula (Suðurnes) in Iceland, though the name is also used by locals to refer to the suburban region of Keflavík and Njarðvík which have grown together over the years. The municipality is made up of the towns Keflavík, Njarðvík and the village of Hafnir. The municipality was created in 1994 when the inhabitants of the three towns voted to merge them into one. Reykjanesbær is the fourth largest municipality in Iceland, with 19,676 citizens (2021).

Overview
Of the three towns which make up the municipality, Keflavík is the largest, while Hafnir is the smallest and some 10 kilometers distant. Keflavík and Njarðvík  were originally distinct towns but gradually grew together over the course of the latter half of the 20th century, until the only thing separating them was a single street. The northern side of the street belonged to Keflavík and the southern side to Njarðvík. 
Since May 2009 the township of Njarðvík has been the location of the Viking World museum (Víkingaheimar).

In 2006, when the United States Navy closed Naval Air Station Keflavik, the site was taken over by the development agency Kadeco, and renamed Ásbrú. A university, Keilir, was founded and now Ásbrú houses the campuses of various educational institutions and also businesses, both newly founded and relocated to the site of the air base.

Demographics

Reykjanesbær is the most populous municipality in the Suðurnes region, the fourth most populous in Iceland, and the most populous outside of the Greater Reykjavík area. The municipality had a population of 18,920 on 1 January 2019; that is about 5.3% of the country's population. The Suðurnes region, which includes Reykjanesbær and five neighbouring municipalities, was home to 27,113 people; that is about 7.6% of the country's population.

On 1 January 2018, of the town's population of 17,805, immigrants of the first and second generation numbered 4,352 (24.4%). 
The most common foreign citizens were Poles, Lithuanians, and Latvians.

Points of interest
The Icelandic Museum of Rock 'n' Roll
Naval Radio Transmitter Facility Grindavik
Reykjanesviti
Viking World museum

Twin towns – sister cities

Reykjanesbær is twinned with:
 Kerava, Finland
 Trollhättan, Sweden

Gallery

References

External links
Reykjanes website  
Visit Reykjanes website 
 More information and photos about Reykjanesbær on Hit Iceland

Municipalities of Iceland
Reykjanes
Keflavík
Southern Peninsula (Iceland)